Eudonia truncicolella is a species of moth of the family Crambidae described by Henry Tibbats Stainton in 1849. It is found in China (Hebei, Heilongjiang, Inner Mongolia, Jiangsu, Jilin, Liaoning), Japan west to Europe.

The wingspan is 18–23 mm. The forewings are ochreous-whitish, much sprinkled with black ; base blackish - marked ; lines whitish, dark -edged, first irregular,second angulate -sinuate, subserrate ; orbicular and claviform dot-like or rather elongate, black; discal spot 8-shaped, outlined with black ; subterminal line whitish, touching second in middle. Hindwings are whitish-grey, darker terminally.The larva is dull dark brown ; dorsal line blackish ; spots black head dark brown ; plate of 2 almost black.

The moth flies from June to October depending on the location. 

The larvae feed on various mosses.

References

External links
 Waarneming.nl 
 Lepidoptera of Belgium 
 Eudonia truncicolella at UKMoths

Eudonia
Moths described in 1849
Moths of Asia
Moths of Europe
Taxa named by Henry Tibbats Stainton